Fabbri Group is an Italian amusement rides manufacturer based in Calto, Italy. They are known for producing a number staple attractions for both amusement parks and funfairs, such as the Booster and the Kamikaze Explorer.

History
Fabbri was founded by Romolo Fabbri in Bergantino, an Italian village which became to home a number of amusement ride producers after World War II.  Manufacturing began in 1950 with the Avio (Aeroplane Ride), a ride specifically designed for traveling shows in Italy. Over the following of years, Fabbri would evolve this attraction into the popular Telecombat ride. In the 1970s Romolo's son, Licinio Fabbri, took over direction of the company, and expanded sales beyond Italy into the rest of the European continent. The company expanded once again with the founding of FC Fabbri Park Sr in 1990s, with the goal of reaching out to the world market. After years of producing many different rides, the Fabbri Group entered the roller coaster market no later than 1998, with the introduction of a Wacky-Worm type ride. In more recent years, the company has found success in producing large thrill rides such as the Booster, a pendulum ride which has sold over 50 units since 2000. Rather than having one central facility for manufacturing, the Fabbri Group has several facilities that each specialize in their own type of ride, all of which are located in nearby towns.

Notable ride types

The Fabbri Group offers a large selection of rides, ranging from small children's rides to large roller coasters. Some of their notable attractions include: 
Booster
Giant Booster 
Crazy Dance (Now sold as Magic Dance)
Eclipse
Evolution(No longer offered) 
Double Shock(No longer offered)
Free Fall Towers
Mega Drop
Jungle Drop
Giant Wheel  
Hard Rock(No longer offered)
Inversion
Kamikaze (Now sold as Saturno)
Kamikaze 2(No longer offered) 
Cataclysm
King Loop (Crazy Shake)(No longer offered)
Mistral 63(No longer sold)
Orbiter (Often known as a Hard Rock, but is a different attraction from the attraction already listed, no longer offered)
Power Mouse
River rapids ride(No longer offered)
Smashing Jump
Tagada
Telecombat

List of roller coasters

As of 2019, Fabbri has built 24 roller coasters around the world.

References

 
Engineering companies of Italy
Amusement ride manufacturers
Roller coaster manufacturers
Roller coaster designers
Manufacturing companies established in 1950
Italian companies established in 1950
Italian brands